Year 651 (DCLI) was a common year starting on Saturday (link will display the full calendar) of the Julian calendar. The denomination 651 for this year has been used since the early medieval period, when the Anno Domini calendar era became the prevalent method in Europe for naming years.

Events 
 By place 
 Europe 
 King Clovis II of Neustria and Burgundy marries Balthild, said to be an Anglo-Saxon aristocrat sold into slavery in Gaul. She has been owned by Clovis' mayor of the palace, Erchinoald, who gives her to him to garner royal favour (approximate date).  

 Britain 
 King Oswiu of Bernicia declares war on his rival, King Oswine of Deira. Oswine refuses to engage him in battle, and retreats to Gilling (North Yorkshire). Oswine is betrayed by a friend, and murdered by Oswiu's soldiers. 
 Œthelwald succeeds his uncle Oswine as king of Deira, and allies himself with Oswiu's enemy, King Penda of Mercia. Queen Eanflæd of Bernicia donates the estate of Gilling for the foundation of a monastery.

 Persia 
 King Yazdegerd III of Persia is murdered in a miller's hut near Merv by his followers, ending both Persian resistance to Arab conquest, and the Sassanid Empire.

 Arabian Caliphate 
 The Rashidun army under Abdullah ibn Aamir invades Afghanistan, and captures the main forts in Khorasan (modern Iran). The Muslim Arabs occupy the cities of Balkh and Herat, which surrender peacefully.
 An embassy led by Sa`d ibn Abi Waqqas arrives in the capital Chang'an via an oversea route. They are greeted by Emperor Gao Zong, who orders the establishment of the first Chinese mosque.
 The Quran is compiled by Caliph Uthman ibn Affan in its modern-day form. The text becomes the model from which copies are made and promulgated throughout the urban centers of the Arab world.

 By topic 
 Religion 
 The Hôtel-Dieu de Paris is founded by bishop Landry (Landericus). It becomes the first major hospital in Paris.

Births

Deaths 
 August 20 – Oswine, king of Deira (England)
 August 31 – Aidan, Irish-born bishop of Lindisfarne
 Braulio, bishop of Zaragoza (b. 590) 
 Dayi Daoxin, Chán Buddhist patriarch (b. 580)
 Grasulf II, duke of Friuli (approximate date)
 Radoald, duke of Benevento (Italy)
 Yazdegard III, king of the Sassanid Empire
 Apranik, Sasanian female military commander.

References